Marius Möchel (born May 28, 1991) is a German professional ice hockey player. He is currently playing for the Schwenninger Wild Wings in the Deutsche Eishockey Liga (DEL). He has formerly played in the DEL with EHC München, Hamburg Freezers, Thomas Sabo Ice Tigers and Grizzlys Wolfsburg.

After four seasons with the Ice Tigers, Möchel left following the 2017–18 campaign, signing a two-year contract with his fourth DEL club, in Grizzlys Wolfsburg, on April 17, 2018.

References

External links

1991 births
Living people
Hamburg Freezers players
German ice hockey forwards
EHC München players
Schwenninger Wild Wings players
Sportspeople from Nuremberg
Starbulls Rosenheim players
Thomas Sabo Ice Tigers players
Grizzlys Wolfsburg players